ZooLights is a commonly-used term for holiday lighting festivals held in zoos during the winter months, including:

 Zoolights at Calgary Zoo
 Zoo Lights at Dallas Zoo
 Zoo Lights at Houston Zoo; see 
 ZooLights at Lincoln Park Zoo in Chicago, Illinois
 ZooLights at the U.S. National Zoo, Washington, D.C.
 ZooLights at Phoenix Zoo
 Zoolights at Point Defiance Zoo & Aquarium in Tacoma, Washington
 LA Zoo Lights at Los Angeles Zoo and Botanical Gardens